Melanie "Mel" Nunes Fronckowiak (born 16 January 1988) is a Brazilian actress, writer, and TV host. Fronckowiak became known after starring in several advertising and TV commercials while working as a model in São Paulo, at the Ford Models agency, which led her to participate in the Brazilian teen telenovela Rebelde, playing the character of Carla. In 2013, Fronckowiak launched herself as a writer. In her first book, Inclassificável: Memórias da Estrada, she tells the experiences she lived traveling around forty Brazilian cities with the band Rebeldes.

Early life

The daughter of psychologist Berenice Nunes and André Fronckowiak, Melanie was born in Araranguá, in the state of Santa Catarina and raised in Pelotas, Rio Grande do Sul. In school, she acted in the play Grêmio estudantil and was several times representative of her class. In high school, she won a scholarship to a university in Santa Cruz do Sul, where her paternal uncle lived.

At the age of nineteen, Fronckowiak became a model after winning the title of Miss World Rio Grande do Sul, also winning Miss Personality and Miss Sul World.

Career
After working as a model, Fronckowiak did amateur theater and began her television career by appearing in commercials. In 2010, she made a cameo appearance in a scene in the Brazilian soap opera Viver a Vida. In 2010, she signed with Rede Record, and the following year she joined the cast of Rebelde, where she played the character of Carla. On the show, Carla is a member of the pop band Rebeldes. The group went on to hold performances outside the program, with Fronckowiak as one of its six members.

In October 2011, the former model was voted Girl of the Year in Meus Prêmios Nick, a teen event sponsored by Nickelodeon Brazil. In 2012, she won two categories in the Troféu Internet, and was nominated to Troféu Imprensa, one of the biggest annual awards on Brazilian television.

In May 2013, Fronckowiak published the book Inclassíficavel: Memórias da Estrada (Unclassifiable: Memories of the Road). According to her, a major publisher turned down the manuscript for "being difficult to classify". This experience influenced the naming of the book. The book includes poetic reflections and a collection of short stories that recorded during the Rebeldes tour of forty cities throughout Brazil.

Since 2014, Fronckowiak has worked as a television presenter. She signed with Rede Bandeirantes to work on the show A Liga. In February 2015, she was hired by Globosat to present Destino Certo, which premiered on 3 September 2015. This was her first solo program, and it was renewed for a second year.

In 2015, Fronckowiak was invited to join the cast of El Hipnotizador, the first bilingual HBO television series in Brazil. It was broadcast simultaneously in all Latin American countries by HBO Brasil and HBO Latin America Group, and also on Hispanic channels in the United States. That same year, Fronckowiak launched a fashion blog called Sweet Ray of Style and received the support of major brands, such as Chanel.

In 2016, Netflix announced Fronckowiak as part of the main cast of 3%, the first Brazilian original series on the streaming service.

Selected filmography

Awards and nominations

Published works
 Inclassificável: Memórias da Estrada (2013)

References

External links

 

1988 births
Living people
Brazilian people of Polish descent
Brazilian people of Portuguese descent
Brazilian television actresses
Brazilian female models
Brazilian non-fiction writers
21st-century Brazilian singers
21st-century Brazilian women singers